Dubinino is an urban locality (an urban-type settlement) in Krasnoyarsk Krai, Russia. Population:

References

Urban-type settlements in Krasnoyarsk Krai
Sharypovo Urban Okrug